Leena Luhtanen (née Nikulainen; born 12 February 1941) is a Finnish politician and a former member of the cabinet. Luhtanen is a member of the Social Democratic Party, and served in the parliament from 1991 until 2007.

She served as the minister of transport and communications in Matti Vanhanen's first cabinet from 2003 to 2005, and thereafter as the minister of justice until the parliamentary elections of 2007. She was not re-elected.

Luhtanen was born in Kuopio, and has been a member of Espoo city council since 1985.

References

External links

1941 births
Living people
People from Kuopio
Social Democratic Party of Finland politicians
Ministers of Justice of Finland
Ministers of Transport and Public Works of Finland
Members of the Parliament of Finland (1991–95)
Members of the Parliament of Finland (1995–99)
Members of the Parliament of Finland (1999–2003)
Members of the Parliament of Finland (2003–07)
Women government ministers of Finland
Female justice ministers
Women members of the Parliament of Finland
Recipients of the Order of the Cross of Terra Mariana, 1st Class
20th-century Finnish women politicians
21st-century Finnish women politicians